SR27 or similar terms may refer to:

 Various highways named "State Route 27" or "State Road 27", see List of highways numbered 27
 Sr27 (gene), a rye immunity gene found in some Triticeae